The Iran Novin Party was a royalist political party in Iran and the country's ruling party for more than a decade, controlling both cabinet and the parliament from 1964 to 1975. People's Party was regarded its opposition.

The party was "indistinguishable from the state", i.e. party of power, with no coherent ideology or agenda. It was the main reason to deny opportunities to seek a popular following through nationalist or socialist appeals, although its pragmatism and opportunism was advantageous in recruiting.

It comprised technocrats and former civil servants; supported the Court (probably having been initiated by it), identifying with the policies of the Shah" and self-proclaimed its role as "guardian" of the White Revolution (Pāsdār-e Enqelāb).

Electoral history

Legislature

Local councils

Leadership

References

External links

1963 establishments in Iran
Political parties established in 1963
1975 disestablishments in Iran
Political parties disestablished in 1975
Monarchist parties in Iran
Secularism in Iran
Political parties in Pahlavi Iran (1941–1979)